Rati is the goddess of passion and lust in Hinduism.

Rati is a given name that may refer to:

A masculine given name of Georgian origin (რატი):
 Rati Andronikashvili (born 2001), Georgian basketball player
 Rati Samkurashvili (born 1977), Georgian politician
 Rati Aleksidze (born 1978), Georgian footballer
 Rati Amaglobeli (born 1977), Georgian poet and translator
 Rati Tsinamdzgvrishvili (born 1988), Georgian footballer
 Rati Urushadze (born 1975), Georgian rugby player

A feminine given name of Indian origin:
 Rati Agnihotri (born 1960), Indian actress
 Rati Pandey, Indian television actress
 Rathi Arumugam, (born 1982), Indian film actress
 Rati Ram, economics professor at Illinois State University, USA

See also

 Ratty (disambiguation)
 Raty, a surname

Georgian masculine given names
Indian feminine given names